Fluxinella vitrina is a species of sea snail, a marine gastropod mollusk in the family Seguenziidae.

Description
The length of the shell attains 3 mm.

Distribution
This marine species occurs off the Philippines.

References

 Poppe G.T., Tagaro S.P. & Stahlschmidt P. (2015). New shelled molluscan species from the central Philippines I. Visaya. 4(3): 15-59. page(s): 19, pl. 2 fig. 3.

External links
 Worms Link

vitrina
Gastropods described in 2015